Village of the Missing is a Canadian documentary film, directed by Michael Del Monte and released in 2019. An examination of the 2010–2017 Toronto serial homicides by Bruce McArthur in Toronto's Church and Wellesley gay village, the film premiered on March 22, 2019 as an episode of the CBC Television documentary series CBC Docs POV.

The film was nominated for the Donald Brittain Award at the 8th Canadian Screen Awards.

References

2019 documentary films
2019 films
2019 LGBT-related films
2019 television films
Canadian documentary television films
Canadian LGBT-related television films
Documentary films about LGBT topics
CBC Television original films
2010s Canadian films